Talona Mountain is a summit in the U.S. state of Georgia.

Talona Mountain takes its name from the former nearby Cherokee settlement at Talona, Georgia.

References

Mountains of Gilmer County, Georgia
Mountains of Georgia (U.S. state)